SciTech is an American online science magazine, containing sections on space, physics, biology, technology and chemistry. It was founded in 1998 by Vicki Hyde. In 2002, SciTech was selected as one of five final nominations in the Science Category for a Webby Award. In 2011, SciTech transitioned to new management as well as overhauled the website’s format and design. As of May 2022, it is estimated that SciTech has 8.7 million monthly readers and is a top 30 science and education website by traffic worldwide.

References

External links

Science and technology magazines
Magazines established in 1998